Hibana is a genus of anyphaenid sac spiders first described by Antônio Brescovit in 1991. It is found from the United States to Brazil, including the West Indies. It includes North America's yellow ghost spider, formerly categorized as Aysha velox.

Species
 it contains eighteen species:
Hibana arunda (Platnick, 1974) – USA, Mexico
Hibana banksi (Strand, 1906) – USA
Hibana bicolor (Banks, 1909) – Costa Rica, Colombia
Hibana cambridgei (Bryant, 1931) – USA, Mexico
Hibana discolor (Mello-Leitão, 1929) – Brazil, Bolivia
Hibana flavescens (Schmidt, 1971) – Colombia
Hibana fusca (Franganillo, 1926) – Cuba
Hibana futilis (Banks, 1898) – USA to Venezuela, Cuba
Hibana gracilis (Hentz, 1847) – USA, Canada
Hibana incursa (Chamberlin, 1919) – USA to Panama
Hibana longipalpa (Bryant, 1931) – El Salvador, Nicaragua, Costa Rica
Hibana melloleitaoi (Caporiacco, 1947) – Mexico to Brazil
Hibana similaris (Banks, 1929) – Mexico to Brazil
Hibana taboga Brescovit, 1991 – Panama
Hibana talmina Brescovit, 1993 – Dominican Rep., Trinidad, northern South America
Hibana tenuis (L. Koch, 1866) – Mexico to Venezuela, Caribbean
Hibana turquinensis (Bryant, 1940) – Cuba
Hibana velox (Becker, 1879) – USA, Mexico, Caribbean

References

External links
 

Anyphaenidae
Araneomorphae genera
Spiders of North America
Spiders of South America
Taxa named by Antônio Brescovit